Poiana Brașov is a neighborhood of Brașov and a Romanian ski resort. 

Most slopes now have snow cannons installed. In 2013, Poiana Brașov hosted figure skating, alpine skiing, and short track in the European Youth Olympic Winter Festival.

There are regular buses operated by Brașov Transit (RATBV) which serve the  route between Brașov and Poiana Brașov (lines 20 and 100). The resort also runs minibusses to take visitors from hotels to the base of the ski runs from where they can hike or take a cable car to Cristianu Mare or Postăvaru summits.

Poiana Brașov has a temperate-continental climate. The average temperature in summer is 20 °C and in winter -4 °C. There is a snow cover of about 50–60 cm which lasts from mid-November until mid-March, for about 120 days a year. However one can expect snowfalls from the end of September.

Poiana Brașov is host to several hotels and restaurants, the majority of which cater to foreign tourists. Two of the better known restaurants are Șura Dacilor (The Dacians' Barn) and Coliba Haiducilor (The Outlaws' Shack). There is also one nightclub, Capra Neagră (The Chamois).

Main Slopes
There are 7 main ski/snowboard slopes in the resort:

Gallery

See also
Tourism in Romania
List of ski areas and resorts in Europe

References

External links

 PoianaBrasov.com - Poiana Brasov Resort
 Pictures and landscapes from the Carpathian Mountains
 Video: Postavarul Mountains
 Video: Poiana Brasov Mountain Resort
 Ski School Poiana Brasov

Ski areas and resorts in Romania
Geography of Brașov County
Tourist attractions in Brașov County
Districts of Brașov